The healthcare system in Greenland is a publicly financed governmental responsibility managed by the Agency for Health and Prevention.  Greenland took over responsibility for the health care system from Denmark in 1992. 

There is a high infant mortality rate and high rates of death due to unnatural causes, especially suicides and accidents.

Healthcare
In 2006, health care cost 938 million Danish kronor corresponding to 2,219 euros per head, almost entirely publicly financed. Health care is more than 18 percent of government expenditure.  About 28 percent is for  Queen Ingrid's Hospital and 12 percent of the budget for specialist treatments outside Greenland, including  serious criminal offenders in specialized psychiatric wards.   Six percent of the total budget goes on transport for patients with acute injuries or illnesses.  Each district has a small hospital and there are health clinics in every village.  Most  elective surgery is performed at Queen Ingrid's Hospital.  It is difficult to recruit clinical staff especially for more remote areas.  

There are no private healthcare services, but there is private dental care, physiotherapy, psychotherapy and treatment for alcohol and drug abuse in Nuuk.

References

 
Greenland